Najee Murray  (born April 21, 1994) is a professional Canadian football defensive back for the Montreal Alouettes of the Canadian Football League (CFL).

University career 
Murray first played college football for the Ohio State Buckeyes in 2012, where he played in the first six games of the season before becoming injured. He then transferred to Kent State University to play for the Golden Flashes, but sat out the 2013 season due to NCAA transfer rules. He then played from 2014 to 2016 for Kent State.

Professional career

Cleveland Browns 
After not being selected in the 2017 NFL Draft, Murray signed with the Cleveland Browns as an undrafted free agent on May 15, 2017. Following training camp, he signed on to the team's practice roster, but was released on September 19, 2017.

Montreal Alouettes 
On April 25, 2018, it was announced that Murray had signed with the Montreal Alouettes. He made the team's active roster following training camp and played in his first professional game on June 16, 2018, against the BC Lions where he had one special teams tackle. He played in the first seven games in 2018 where he had six defensive tackles, two special teams tackles, and one interception, before spending the rest of the season on the injured list. Murray was released during the following off season on May 4, 2019.

On October 2, 2019, Murray re-signed with the Alouettes and played in the last four games of the regular season where he had 16 defensive tackles, one special teams tackle, and one interception. He scored his first career touchdown on November 1, 2019, after intercepting Ottawa Redblacks quarterback Will Arndt and returning the ball 15 yards for the score. He played in his first post-season game on November 10, 2019, in the East Semi-Final loss to the Edmonton Eskimos where he had four defensive tackles.

In 2021, Murray played in 10 out of 14 regular season games where he had 24 defensive tackles, two special teams tackles, three interceptions, and one touchdown. He signed a two-year contract extension with the Alouettes on December 17, 2021.

Personal life 
Murray was born in Steubenville, Ohio, to parents Danita Murray-Hampton and Horace Hampton.

References

External links 
Montreal Alouettes bio 

1994 births
Living people
American football defensive backs
American players of Canadian football
Canadian football defensive backs
Cleveland Browns players
Montreal Alouettes players
Sportspeople from Steubenville, Ohio
Players of Canadian football from Ohio
Seattle Seahawks players
Kent State Golden Flashes football players